CSS Muscogee was an casemate ironclad built in Columbus, Georgia for the Confederate States Navy during the American Civil War. Her original paddle configuration was judged a failure when she could not be launched on the first attempt in 1864. She had to be rebuilt to use dual propeller propulsion. Later renamed CSS Jackson and armed with four 7-inch (178 mm) and two 6.4-inch (163 mm) cannons. She was captured while still fitting out and was set ablaze by Union troops in April 1865. Her wreck was salvaged in 1962–1963 and turned over to the National Civil War Naval Museum in Columbus for display. The ironclad's remains were listed on the National Register of Historic Places in 1970.

Background and description
Muscogee was originally built as a sister ship to the casemate ironclad paddle steamer CSS Missouri, to a rough design by the Chief Naval Constructor, John L. Porter, as a sternwheel-powered ironclad. She proved to be too heavy to be launched on January 1, 1864 and had to be reconstructed and lengthened to a modified CSS Albemarle-class design, based on Porter's advice during his visit to the ironclad on January 23.

As part of the reconstruction, the ironclad was lengthened to  overall after a new fantail was built on the stern. The ironclad had a gross register tonnage of 1,250 tons.

As originally designed, Muscogee was propelled by a sternwheel that was partially enclosed by a recess at the aft end of the casemate; the upper portion of the paddle wheel protruded above the casemate and would have been exposed to enemy fire. The sternwheel was probably powered by a pair of inclined two-cylinder direct-acting steam engines taken from the steamboat Time using steam provided by four return-flue boilers to the engines. As part of her reconstruction, Times engines were replaced by a pair of single-cylinder, horizontal direct-acting steam engines from the adjacent Columbus Naval Iron Works, each of which drove a single  propeller; the original boilers appear to have been retained.

Muscogees casemate was built with ten gun ports, two each at the bow and stern and three on the broadside. The ship was armed with four  and two  Brooke rifles. The fore and aft cannons were on pivot gun mounts.

History

Muscogee was laid down during 1862 at the Columbus Naval Yard at Columbus, Georgia, on the banks of the Chattahoochee River. The first attempt to launch her failed on January 1, 1864, despite the high water on the river and the assistance of the steamboat Mariana. Porter came down afterwards to examine the ironclad and recommended that she be rebuilt with screw propulsion rather than the sternwheel. She was finally launched on December 22, having been renamed Jackson at some point during the year. A shortage of iron plate greatly hindered the ironclad's completion.

On April 17, 1865, after the Union's Wilson's Raiders captured the city during the Battle of Columbus, Georgia, Jackson was set ablaze by Union troops while still fitting out and had her moorings cut. She was not thought to be worth salvaging because of the fire damage, but the Army Corps of Engineers dredged around her wreck in 1910 and salvaged her machinery. The only detail about her armor that he recorded was that it curved over the edge of the deck and extended below the waterline.

Recovery 
CSS Jacksons remains were raised in two pieces; the  stern section in 1962 and the  bow section the following year. They were then placed on exhibit at the National Civil War Naval Museum in Columbus. A thick metal white frame outline, indicating the various dimensions of Jacksons original fore and aft deck arrangements and armored casemate, is now erected directly above the hull's wooden remains to simulate for visitors the ironclad's original size and shapes. The ship's fantail, which was stored outside in a pole barn, was partially destroyed in a fire on 1 June 2020.

The ironclad was listed on the National Register of Historic Places on May 13, 1970.

See also

Bibliography of American Civil War naval history

References

Citations

Bibliography

Further reading

Ironclad warships of the Confederate States Navy
Georgia (U.S. state) in the American Civil War
Shipwrecks on the National Register of Historic Places in Georgia (U.S. state)
Ships built in Georgia (U.S. state)
1864 ships
Maritime incidents in April 1865
Scuttled vessels
Shipwrecks in rivers
Shipwrecks of the American Civil War
National Register of Historic Places in Muscogee County, Georgia